Badlapur (Pronunciation: [bəd̪lapuːɾ]) is a city in Thane district, Maharashtra state, India. It is a part of the Mumbai Metropolitan Region.

Matheran Range
The Matheran Range starts at Haji Malang in the north-north-west, continues to Tavli in the north, and then runs south and finally terminates at Bhivpuri Road Hill. Strictly speaking, this range is not a part of the Sahyadris, but rather runs parallel to the Badlapur-Karjat railway line to its west. The Sahyadris proper run parallel to the same railway line, but to its east.

References

Cities and towns in Thane district